
Gmina Urszulin is a rural gmina (administrative district) in Włodawa County, Lublin Voivodeship, in eastern Poland.

The gmina contains part of the protected area called Polesie Landscape Park.

Villages
Gmina Urszulin contains the villages and settlements of Andrzejów, Babsk, Bieleckie, Borysik, Dębowiec, Dyszczytno, Grabniak, Grobelki, Jamniki, Kalinówka, Koło Młyna, Kozubata, Łomnica, Michałów, Nowe Załucze, Olszowo, Pod Bubnowem, Przymiarki, Sęków, Stare Załucze, Sumin, Urszulin, Wereszczyn, Wiązowiec, Wielkopole, Wincencin, Wola Wereszczyńska, Wólka Wytycka, Wujek, Wytyczno, Zabrodzie, Zarudka, Zastawie and Zawadówka.

Neighbouring gminas
Gmina Urszulin is bordered by the gminas of Cyców, Hańsk, Ludwin, Sosnowica, Stary Brus and Wierzbica.

References
Polish official population figures 2006

Urszulin
Włodawa County